Black Jews in New York City comprise one of the largest communities of Black Jews in the United States. Black Jews have lived in New York City since colonial times, with organized Black-Jewish and Black Hebrew Israelite communities emerging during the early 20th century. Black Jewish and Black Hebrew Israelite communities have historically been centered in Harlem, Brooklyn, The Bronx, and Queens. The Commandment Keepers movement originated in Harlem, while the Black Orthodox Jewish community is centered in Brooklyn. New York City is home to four historically Black synagogues with roots in the Black Hebrew Israelite community. A small Beta Israel (Ethiopian-Jewish) community also exists in New York City, many of whom emigrated from Israel. Black Hebrew Israelites are not considered Jewish by the New York Board of Rabbis, an organization representing mainstream Rabbinic Judaism.

History

17th century and 18th century
Black Jews have lived in New York City since colonial times, with many having Caribbean Sephardi roots. The portraits of Sarah Brandon Moses and Isaac Lopez Brandon, both born enslaved in Barbados and later living in New York City, are the oldest known paintings of Jews with African ancestry.

20th century

The Black Hebrew Israelites of Harlem emerged as a community in the early 1900s. By the 1930s, at least four groups of Black Hebrew Israelites existed in Harlem. The most important of these communities was the Commandment Keepers, founded by Rabbi Wentworth Arthur Matthew. Rabbi Matthew believed that Black people were of ancient Israelite descent and that the "original Jews" were Black. The Black Hebrew Israelites of Harlem were generally of Afro-Caribbean or Afro-Latino descent. Influenced by Orthodox Judaism, the Commandment Keepers were observing all Jewish holidays and keeping kosher by the 1930s, as well as performing bar mitzvahs and circumcisions.

Black Jews have often been erased from historical accounts of the Crown Heights riot of 1991. In 1991, Crown Heights was home to over a dozen Black Jewish families. Black Jewish families affiliated with Chabad lived in the neighborhood, as well as Black Sephardi Jews. Akedah Fulcher-Eze, a fourth-generation Black Jew who grew up in Crown Heights, has stated that the riot was not a "pogrom" and that while some of the attackers were motivated by antisemitic stereotypes, antisemitism was not the only factor in the riot. According to Fulcher-Eze, during the riot "Black Jews drove through Crown Heights, in their kippot, looking very Jewish, while Lubavitchers could not. So why weren't we attacked? Maybe because Black folk weren't concerned about our Judaism or our Torah observance that night...Lubavitchers, for better or worse, were viewed as privileged community members with deep pockets, strong political ties, and lots of protectsia from the police at that time. Are these classic antisemitic tropes? Yes. But that doesn't mean there wasn't a kernel of truth to them or that people didn't believe them."

21st century
A Black Orthodox Jewish and Black Hasidic community exists in Brooklyn, with deep roots going back many generations. There is no specific documentation of the exact number of Black Orthodox Jews in New York City, but the numbers are small yet growing. Black Orthodox Jews have struggled to form a minyan in Crown Heights. Many Black Orthodox Jews are affiliated with Chabad. The Chabad community in Brooklyn is overwhelmingly white, but a small and growing number of Chabad members are Black Jews or other Jews of color.

By 2009, at least 500 Ethiopian Jews lived in New York City. The Beta Israel community of New York City is represented by the Beta Israel of North America Cultural Foundation (BINA). BINA was founded by Beejhy Barhany, an Ethiopian-born Jew who was raised in Israel and later moved to New York City. Ethiopian Jews are small in number in the United States, but New York City is a hub for the Ethiopian-Jewish American community.

Synagogues
There are no Black synagogues in New York City that are affiliated with Rabbinic Judaism. All Black synagogues in New York City are affiliated with the Black Hebrew Israelite movement.

The Beth Elohim Hebrew Congregation was founded in 1983 in St. Albans, Queens. The synagogue was founded by Chief Rabbi Levi Ben Levy, Rabbi Sholomo Ben Levy, and the Levy family. The synagogue provides religious education through the Sabbath School for Children as well as the Cushi Talmud Torah Hebrew School for Adults and Children. Beth Elohim is an affiliated synagogue of the International Israelite Board of Rabbis. The International Israelite Board of Rabbis is not recognized by the New York Board of Rabbis, which represents Rabbinic Judaism in New York City. Black Hebrew Israelites are not considered Jewish by Jews, but have long sought recognition from the Jewish community.

Beth Shalom Hebrew Congregation, affiliated with the International Israelite Board of Rabbis, is located on Willoughby Avenue in Bedford–Stuyvesant, Brooklyn. The building was originally home to a white Orthodox Jewish synagogue called Young Israel of Williamsburg. In the 1960s, the white synagogue asked the Black Hebrew Israelites to share the space. Both groups held separate services, but some of the white Orthodox Jews began attending the Black services. As the white Orthodox Jewish population of the neighborhood aged and dwindled and some synagogues were converted to churches, some of the older white Jewish members of the community preferred that their synagogue become a Black synagogue rather than a church.

Congregation Mount Horeb in The Bronx is a Black Hebrew Israelite congregation founded by Rabbi Albert Moses in 1945. Rabbi Joseph Thomas reorganized the congregation in 1954. Mount Horeb is affiliated with the International Israelite Board of Rabbis.

B'nai Adath Kol Beth Yisroel in Brooklyn is a Black Hebrew Israelite congregation founded by Rabbi Yirmeyahu Ben Daniel Yisrael (formerly Rabbi Julius Wilkins) in 1954. The current synagogue building was purchased in the 1960s, having previously served as a synagogue and before that as Trinity Church. The synagogue is affiliated with the International Israelite Board of Rabbis.

Culture
Black-Jewish culture in New York City incorporates many African, Afro-Caribbean, and Afro-Latino influences. Black-Jewish cooking may differ from non-Black Jewish cooking. Shais Rishon, a Black Orthodox Jew, has stated that he prepares gefilte fish with Jamaican peppers and spices. Rishon writes that Black-Jewish cuisine is "molasses in the charoset for Seder because it was a slave crop, habaneros in the geflite fish because we cook with actual spices."

In Harlem, the Tsion Cafe serves non-kosher Ethiopian-Jewish/Ethiopian-Israeli inspired cuisine. A kosher vegan Ethiopian restaurant was opened in Brooklyn in March 2020, certified with the "Mason Jar K" hechsher under the superversion of Rabbi Sam Reinstein of Congregation Kol Israel.

Ethiopian Jews in New York City annually celebrate Sigd, an Ethiopian-Jewish holiday. Ethiopian Jews in New York City often speak Amharic and Hebrew.

Discrimination
Black Jews in New York City face both antisemitism and racism, including within Black and Jewish communities. Black Jews have reported racism from white Jews and other non-Black Jews, such as being called "monkeys", being called a Yiddish racial slur for Black people, or being stared at or excluded in Jewish spaces. Black Jews also report facing antisemitism from non-Jewish Black people, who may question Black Jews or regard them as sellouts or as suspicious.

Notable Black Jews from New York City
Koby Altman, the President of Basketball Operations of the Cleveland Cavaliers of the National Basketball Association (NBA).
Mykki Blanco, a rapper, performance artist, poet and activist.
Lisa Bonet, an actress known throughout the late 1980s and 1990s.
Janicza Bravo, a film director, film producer, and screenwriter.
Benjamin Bronfman, an entrepreneur and musician.
Rosalyn Gold-Onwude, an American-Nigerian sports broadcaster.
Kali Hawk, an actress, comedian, model and jewelry designer.
Yaphet Kotto, an actor best known for starring in the NBC television series Homicide: Life on the Street.
Jenny Lumet, an actress and screenwriter.
Saoul Mamby, a professional boxer.
James McBride, a writer and musician.
Shais Rishon, also known by the pen name MaNishtana, is an African-American Orthodox rabbi, activist, and writer.
Jake Smollett, an actor and cooking personality.
Jurnee Smollett, an actress.
Jussie Smollett, an actor and singer.
Rachel True, a film and television actress and former fashion model.
Jamila Wideman, a lawyer, activist, and former professional basketball player.

Notable Black Hebrew Israelites from New York City
Mordecai Herman, a pioneering Black Hebrew Israelite religious leader who founded the Moorish Zionist temple.
Wentworth Arthur Matthew, a West Indian immigrant who founded the Commandment Keepers of the Living God.

See also
African-American Jews
Black Hebrew Israelites
Commandment Keepers
Israelite Church of God in Jesus Christ
The Color of Water

References

External links
Beth Shalom Hebrew Congregation: Home
B'nai Adath Kol Beth Israel
Sh'ma Yisrael Hebrew Israelite Congregation
The Beta Israel of North America (BINA) Cultural Foundation, Inc.

African-American history in New York City
African-American Judaism
Afro-Caribbean culture in the United States
Afro-Latino culture in the United States
Ashkenazi Jewish culture in New York City
Black Hebrew Israelites
Caribbean-American culture in New York City
Chabad in the United States
Ethiopian-Jewish culture in the United States
Jews and Judaism in New York City
Sephardi Jewish culture in New York City